Millennium Promise, or The Millennium Promise Alliance, Inc., is a non-profit organization incorporated under the laws of the State of Delaware, dedicated to ending extreme poverty within our lifetime. Its flagship initiative is the Millennium Villages Project. This project highlighted how integrated, community-led development, even in some of the poorest communities across rural sub-Saharan Africa, can lead to progress in achieving the Millennium Development Goals (MDGs). Can provide communities with the basic tools and necessities to break out of poverty, on the path toward self-sustainable development.  Millennium Promise oversees the Millennium Villages Project in collaboration with the Earth Institute at Columbia University and the United Nations Development Program (UNDP).

Background
The project reflects Millennium Promise's focus on simultaneously addressing the inter-connected challenges of poverty - which include hunger and malnutrition, disease and lack of access to health care, poor education, and insufficient infrastructure, among others. The organization engages partners from the private and public sectors, national governments, and individuals in support of its work in the Millennium Villages and for a broader policy and advocacy agenda in support of the MDGs.  As such, Millennium Promise recognizes the critical importance of partnerships in addressing the many dimensions of poverty.  Among the Millennium Promise MDG Global Leaders are fashion icon Tommy Hilfiger, the founder of Diesel, Renzo Rosso, and Senegalese musician and UNICEF ambassador Youssou N'Dour.

A central goal of Millennium Promise, using the platform of the Millennium Villages Project, is to demonstrate the power of practical, low-cost and community-led approaches to poverty alleviation that can be replicated at scale by developing nations around the world. Through the Millennium Villages Project, Millennium Promise works in over 80 villages across ten different countries in sub-Saharan Africa – Ethiopia, Ghana, Kenya, Malawi, Mali, Nigeria, Rwanda, Senegal, Tanzania, and Uganda. Each Millennium Village site is a cluster of a village or villages, of approximately 5,000 inhabitants per cluster.

Millennium Promise was co-founded by the renowned international economist and Director of The Earth Institute at Columbia University, Professor Jeffrey Sachs, and philanthropist and Wall Street leader Ray Chambers in 2005. The organization is headquartered in New York, New York, with regional headquarters in Bamako, Mali and Nairobi, Kenya, and national affiliates in Canada, the United Kingdom, and the Netherlands.  Peter Neidecker is CEO of Millennium Promise. Prior to joining Millennium Promise, Mr. Neidecker served as the director of programs for the Children's Investment Fund Foundation in London.

In September 2006, the financier and philanthropist George Soros pledged $50 million to Millennium Promise to fund 33 Millennium Villages. This donation has received added attention as a departure from Soros' characteristic sponsorship of democracy building and good governance-focused programs.

Results published in May 2010 of three years of work from five of the Millennium Villages sites, in Harvests of Development in Rural Africa: The Millennium Villages after Three Years, reported an average three-fold increase in maize yields, a seven-fold increase in access to basic sanitation, and an over 50% reduction in malaria prevalence, among other factors. On May 30, 2010, United Nations Secretary General Ban Ki-moon visited the Millennium Village of Mwandama, Malawi, and he stated: "I congratulate the leadership of the village and the whole community – especially the women of Mwandama – for their hard work and their commitment to a better life for their children and for generations to come... .  Today, I call on every country to look closely at this success. It is a case study in what is possible, even in the poorest places in the world."

In addition to the Millennium Villages Project, Millennium Promise also supports independent projects and initiatives to address extreme poverty. Millennium Promise is a founding partner of the organization Malaria No More. Launched in December 2006 at the White House Summit on Malaria, Malaria No More brings together corporations, foundations, faith-based groups, grassroots networks, and the public to support a comprehensive approach to control malaria. In 2010, Millennium Promise, in collaboration with the Earth Institute and Ericsson Mobile, founded a global education initiative called Connect To Learn, the focuses on bringing access to a 21st-century education – including secondary school – to all children, and in particular girls.

References

External links
 
 

Non-profit organizations based in Delaware
Community building
Millennium Development Goals